The Southern Cross Trophy is a cricket trophy that was awarded to the winner of Test series between Australia and Zimbabwe. The Trophy was first contested in a single-Test series in Zimbabwe in 1999, which was accompanied by a series of three One Day Internationals. In the first Test of the second and last series of the Trophy in the 2003–04 season, Matthew Hayden scored a then-record highest Test score by a batsman, a 380 that won him the player of the series award.

List of Test series

References

See also
Australia national cricket team
Zimbabwe national cricket team
Australian cricket team in Zimbabwe in 1999–2000
Zimbabwean cricket team in Australia in 2003–04

Test cricket competitions
Cricket awards and rankings